Antillanthus is a genus of the tribe Senecioneae in the family Asteraceae described as a genus in 2006.  Many members of this genus were previously listed as Pentacalia and Senecio.

The entire genus is endemic to Cuba. IPNI

Species
 Antillanthus acunae (Borhidi) B.Nord. - Pentacalia acunae Borhidi
 Antillanthus almironcillo (M. Gomez) B. Nord. - Senecio almironcillo M.Gomez - Pentacalia almironcillo (M. Gomez) Proctor 
 Antillanthus azulensis (Alain) B. Nord. - Senecio azulensis Alain
 Antillanthus biseriatus (Alain) B. Nord. - Senecio biseriatus Alain
 Antillanthus carinatus (Greenm.) B. Nord. - Senecio carinatus Greenm. - Pentacalia carinata (Greenm.) Borhidi
 Antillanthus cubensis (Greenm.) B. Nord. - Senecio cubensis Greenm. - Pentacalia cubensis (Greenm.) Borhidi 
 Antillanthus ekmanii (Alain) B.Nord.  - Senecio ekmanii Alain
 Antillanthus eriocarphus (Greenm.) B. Nord. -Senecio eriocarphus Greenm.  - Pentacalia eriocarpha (Greenm.) Borhidi
 Antillanthus leucolepis (Greenm.) B. Nord. - Senecio leucolepis Greenm. - Pentacalia leucolepis (Greenm.) Borhidi
 Antillanthus moaensis (Alain) B. Nord.  - Senecio moaensis Alain - Pentacalia moaensis (Alain) Borhidi
 Antillanthus moldenkei (Greenm. & Alain) B. Nord. - Senecio moldenkei Greenm. & Alain
 Antillanthus pachylepis (Greenm.) B. Nord.  - Senecio pachylepis Greenm.
 Antillanthus pachypodus (Greenm.) B. Nord.  - Senecio pachypodus Greenm. - Pentacalia pachypoda (Greenm.) Borhidi
 Antillanthus saugetii (Alain) B. Nord. - Senecio saugetii Alain - Pentacalia saugetii (Alain) Borhidi
 Antillanthus shaferi (Greenm.) B. Nord.  - Senecio shaferi Greenm.  - Pentacalia shaferi (Greenm.) Borhidi
 Antillanthus subsquarrosus (Greenm.) B. Nord. - Senecio subsquarrosus Greenm.
 Antillanthus trichotomus (Greenm.) B. Nord. - Senecio trichotomus Greenm. - Pentacalia trichotoma'' (Greenm.) Borhidi

References

Senecioneae
Asteraceae genera